The 1978 United States Senate election in Oklahoma took place on November 7, 1978. Incumbent Republican Senator Dewey F. Bartlett retired, leaving the seat vacant. He was succeeded by popular Democratic Governor David Boren.

Boren won a competitive Democratic primary against former U.S. Representative Ed Edmondson and State Senator Gene Stipe, then defeated Edmondson in a run-off election. Boren easily defeated Republican nominee Robert B. Kamm in the general election.

Democratic primary

Candidates
David Boren, Governor of Oklahoma
Dean Bridges
Ed Edmondson, former U.S. Representative from Muskogee and nominee for Senate in 1972 and 1974
George Miskovsky Sr., former State Senator and Representative from Oklahoma City
Anthony Points
Rosella Peter "Pete" Saker, retired Chief Master Sergeant and Vietnam veteran
Gene Stipe, State Senator from McAlester

Campaign
Edmondson called Boren "a Republican" due to a Boren policy as Governor which eliminated the state tax for inheritances between spouses. Edmondson took a pledge recited on a biography of President Harry Truman, that he was not nor had never been "a Republican."

During the campaign, both Miskovsky and Points accused Governor Boren of being a homosexual. Boren held a press conference denying the accusation. Following his victory, Boren swore an oath on a family Bible, declaring "I know what homosexuals and bisexuals are. I further swear that I am not a homosexual or bisexual. And I further swear that I have never been a homosexual or bisexual. And I further swear that I have never engaged in any homosexual or bisexual activities nor do I approve of or condone them." In 2019, Boren was accused by multiple witnesses of sexually harassing male subordinates while President of the University of Oklahoma.

Results

Run-off results

General election

Results

See also
1978 United States Senate elections

References 

1978
Oklahoma
United States Senate